The prince Viliami Tupoulahi Mailefihi Tukuʻaho (17 June 1957 -  14 June 2014 ) was a Tongan politician and Cabinet Minister, member of the royal family, and holder of the  Tuʻipelehake prince title,  one of the thirty three titles of the Tongan hereditary nobility.

Title and Family
Tuku'aho was the youngest son of Prince Fatafehi Tuʻipelehake. He inherited the Tuʻipelehake title after his brother Prince Sione ʻUluvalu Ngu Takeivulai Tukuʻaho died in a car crash in the United States in July 2006. He was the seventh title holder since its institution in the 19th century.

He was married four times. In 1983 he married a commoner, Mele Vikatolia Faletau, renouncing his princely title in order to do so. They had two children. His princely title was however restored by King George Tupou V in 2008. His fourth marriage, in January 2011, followed the divorce of his third wife, ʻEneʻio Tatafu. He then married Fifita Holeva Tuʻihaʻangana, from a noble family, Lord Tuʻihaʻangana's sister.

Education
Mailefihi completed his studies at Queensland Agricultural College (part of the University of Queensland), in Australia, then at Oxford University, in the United Kingdom), where he obtained a Certificate of International Affairs, and finally a graduation in port and naval administration et navale at the Institute of Science and Technology at Wales University (currently named Cardiff University).

Military, administrative and political career
He briefly served in the Tonga Defence Services from 1979 to 1981. He was the Military Liaison Officer at the Foreign Affairs Ministry from 1980 to 1981. From 1986 to 1992, he was the Director of the Navy Department.

He served as Noble Representative from Tongatapu from 2006 to 2007, then as Noble Representative from Ha’apai from 2008 to 2009. In 2009 he was appointed Minister of Agriculture, Forestry and Fisheries. Following the 2010 election he was not reappointed to Sialeʻataongo Tuʻivakanō's cabinet.

Sports career

Mailefihi was a high level sportsman, being captain of the Tonga national rugby sevens team in the late 1970s. It was that team which won the golden medal at the 1979 Pacific Games in Suva, defeating Fiji, the host country, in the final. He was also the Tonga national rugby union team head coach during the 1987 Rugby World Cup, as well as manager of the Tonga national team at the 1995 Rugby World Cup.

Death
Suffering from diabetes since several years, and after suffering an amputation of both legs due to this reason, he was hospitalised again on the Beginning of June 2014 and died in hospital on 14 June.

Notes

External links
Prince Mailefihi international statistics at ESPN Scrum
Mailefihi Tuku'aho international statistics at ESPN Scrum

Tongan politicians
Tongan nobles
Tongan rugby union coaches
Tongan rugby union players
University of Queensland alumni
Alumni of the University of Oxford
Alumni of Cardiff University
1957 births
2014 deaths
Tonga international rugby union players
Rugby union locks
Tonga international rugby sevens players
Tongan rugby sevens players
Tonga national rugby union team coaches